The Barmanou (or Barmanu or Baddmanus) is allegedly a bipedal humanoid primate cryptid that inhabits the mountainous region of northern Pakistan. Shepherds living in the mountains have reported sightings. 

The Barmanou is the Pakistani equivalent of the Bigfoot. The term Barmanou originating in Khowar, but now used in several Pakistani languages including Urdu, Shina, Pashto and Kashmiri.  In addition to the name Barmanou there are a few local variant names as well.

The proposed range of the Barmanou covers the Chitral and Karakoram Ranges, between the Pamirs and the Himalaya. This places the Barmanou between the ranges of two more-famous cryptids, the Almas of Central Asia and the Yeti of the Himalayas.

The Barmanou allegedly possesses both human and apelike characteristics and has a reputation for abducting women and attempting to mate with them. It is also reported to wear animal skins upon its back and head. The Barmanou appears in the folklore of the Northern Regions of Pakistan and depending on where the stories come from it tends to be either described as an ape or a wild man.

The first search in Pakistan for Bipedal Humanoid man was carried out by a Spanish zoologist living in France, Jordi Magraner, from 1987 to 1990. He wrote a paper, Les Hominidés reliques d'Asie Centrale,
on the Pakistani cryptid – the wild man. 

He later researched the Barmanou extensively in the 1990s, but was murdered in Afghanistan in 2002. Loren Coleman wrote that he "collected more than fifty firsthand sighting accounts, and all eyewitnesses recognized the reconstruction of Heuvelman's homo pongoides ["apelike man"--i.e., a living Neanderthal.]. They picked out homo pongoides as their match to Barmanu from Magraner's ID kit of drawings of apes, fossil men, aboriginals, monkeys, and the Minnesota Iceman."

In May 1994, during a search in Shishi Kuh valley, Chitral, cryptologist Jordi Margraner, Anne Mallasseand and another associate reported that once during a late evening they heard unusual guttural sounds which only a primitive voice-box could have produced. No further progress could be made.

See also

 Amomongo – Philippines
 Daeva or Div  – Tajikistan, Iran
 Yeti – Siberia
 Am Fear Liath Mòr – Scotland, United Kingdom
 Fouke Monster – United States
 Bigfoot – United States
 Hibagon – Japan
 Yeren – China 
 Mapinguari – South America
 Menk, Russia
 Momo the Monster – United States
 Orang Mawas – Malaysia

References

External links

 Jordi Magraner's Oral Statements Concerning Living Unknown Hominids
 Pakistanese Barmanu
 Tracking Down the Wild Men
 Video - An evening with Jordi Magraner
 The News (9 Sep 2007) article on the Pakistani Barmanou (Barmanu) "The Bigfoot Legend" and Jordi Magraner

Hominid cryptids
Pakistani culture
Pakistani folklore
Pakistani legendary creatures
Afghan culture